Charles Tufts (July 16, 1781 – December 24, 1876) was an American businessman and philanthropist.

Biography
Tufts was born in Medford, Massachusetts, the son of Abigail and Daniel Tafts. He was a descendant of Peter Tufts, an early colonist who came to America from England circa 1637. He received a common-school education. He made a fortune through his brickmaking factory, and inherited a large amount of land. Tufts donated  of land in Medford, Massachusetts, for what was to be named Tufts University. He married Hannah Robinson in 1821, but had no children.

He died in Somerville, Massachusetts, which is also home to part of the Tufts University campus, and was buried in Mount Auburn Cemetery in Cambridge.

Legacy
 Tufts University
 The World War II Liberty Ship SS Charles Tufts was named in his honor and built in Portland, Oregon in 1944.

References

External links

Tufts University timeline

1781 births
1876 deaths
People from Medford, Massachusetts
Burials at Mount Auburn Cemetery
19th-century American philanthropists
19th-century American businesspeople